On March 23, 1963, the Brandon Wheat Kings clinched their second straight MJHL title before more than 4,000 hometown fans in Brandon. The Wheat Kings retained 
the Turnbull Memorial Trophy.

League notes
League shorten the 40 game regular season in order to accommodate Memorial Cup playoffs.

Regular season

All-Star game
The Manitoba - Saskatchewan classic was held in Regina on January 21, with SJHL winning 5-2. The SJHL scored the first two goals of the game, held period leads of 2-1 and 4-1. SJHL leading goal scorer Wayne Caufield lead the way with a pair, Joe Watson, Garry Peters, and Granger Evans added singles. MJHL scoring leader Bob Stoyko, and Bobby Brown scored for the MJHL.
MJHL Lineup:
Goal: Henry Goy (St. Boniface); Rick Best (Braves)
Defence: Ray Clearwater (Braves); Tracy Pratt (Brandon); George Butterworth (St. Boniface); John Trojack (St. Boniface); Terry Ball (Rangers)
Centre: Bob Stoyko (Brandon); Steve Yoshino (St. Boniface); Bob Toothhill (Braves)
Leftwing: Ted Irvine (St. Boniface); Jim Irving (Rangers); Dave Janaway (Brandon)
Rightwing: Jerry Korp (Brandon); Dave Confrey (St. Boniface); Bobby Brown (Brandon)
Coach: Pete Kapusta (St. Boniface); Manager: Bill Addison (Braves)

Playoffs
Semi-Finals
Brandon defeated Monarchs 3-games-to-2
St. Boniface defeated Braves 3-games-to-none
Turnbull Cup Championship
Brandon defeated St. Boniface 4-games-to-1
Western Memorial Cup Semi-Final
Brandon  defeated Fort William Canadiens (TBJHL) 4-games-to-none
Western Memorial Cup Final (Abbott Cup)
Brandon lost to Edmonton Oil Kings (CAHL) 4-games-to-1

Awards

All-Star Teams

References
Manitoba Junior Hockey League
Manitoba Hockey Hall of Fame
Hockey Hall of Fame
Winnipeg Free Press Archives
Brandon Sun Archives

MJHL
Manitoba Junior Hockey League seasons